The Shock of the New is an eight-part documentary television series about the development of modern art written and presented in 1980 by Robert Hughes for the BBC, in association with Time-Life Films. It was produced by Lorna Pegram, who also directed three of the episodes.

Overview
The series took three years to create and Robert Hughes travelled about a quarter of a million miles during the filming to include particular places or people. The series also used archive footage of featured artists.

The series was broadcast by the BBC in 1980 in the United Kingdom and by PBS in 1981 in the United States. It addressed the development of modern art since the Impressionists and was accompanied by a book of the same name; its combination of insight, wit and accessibility are still widely praised. Hughes remembers being directed by Pegram with her saying, "It's a clever argument, Bob dear, but what are we supposed to be looking at?".

In 2004 Hughes created a one-hour update to The Shock of the New titled The NEW Shock of the New.

Series outline

The series consisted of eight episodes each one hour long (58 min approx). It was re-broadcast on PBS in the United States. In the three cases, where PBS changed the titles, they are given in square brackets below. Quotations are spoken by Martin Jarvis.

Mechanical Paradise –  How the development of technology influenced art between 1880 and end of World War I. Cubism and Futurism
Cézanne, Picasso, Braque, Gris, Leger, Delaunay, Marinetti, Boccioni, Balla, Severini, Picabia, Duchamp 
The Powers That Be [Shapes of Dissent] –  Examining the relationship between modern art and authority. Dada, Constructivism, Futurism, architecture of power
World War I and industrialised death, Exile and intellectuals as a class, Lenin, Tzara, Janco, Arp, Ball, Duchamp, Kirchner, Ernst, Höch, Dix, de Chirico, Hausmann, Grosz, Gabo, Tatlin, Moholy-Nagy, Lissitzky, Rodchenko, Marinetti, Prampolini, Speer, Piacentini, Lincoln Center, Kennedy Center, Albany Mall, Picasso's Guernica, Tinguely 
The Landscape of Pleasure –  Examining art's relationship with the pleasures of nature, and visions of paradise 1870s to 1950s. Impressionism, Post-Impressionism, Fauvism
Fête champêtre, Titian, Giorgione, Jean-Antoine Watteau, Gainsborough, Bourgeoisie, Seurat, Claude Monet, Paul Cézanne, the vivid colours of the South, Paul Gauguin, André Derain, Maurice de Vlaminck, Henri Matisse, Pierre Bonnard, Braque, Picasso, late Matisse 
Trouble in Utopia – Examining the aspirations and reality of modern architecture. International Style, Art Nouveau, Futurist architecture, urban planning
Johnson, Boullée, Garnier, Chiattone, Sant'Elia, Melnikov, Rodchenko, Leonidov, Sullivan, Labrouste, Berg, Mies, Le Corbusier, Chandigarh, Werkbund exhibition 1927, Bauhaus, Gropius, Behrens, De Stijl, Rietveld, van Duesberg, Mondrian, La Defense, Pruitt–Igoe, Costa, Niemeyer, Brasilia
The Threshold of Liberty – Examining the surrealists' attempts to make art without restrictions.
May 1968, Breton, Ernst, de Chirico, Böcklin, Ducasse, child art, madness, Rousseau, Cheval, Miro, Gaudi, Dalí, flea market, Jean, Brauner, Paalen, Oppenheim, Man Ray, Margritte, de Sade, Catholicism and sexual taboo, Bellmer, Cornell, Pollock, Rothko, Gorky, Hofmann, 1945 liberation, Christo, Burden, hippies and self-expression, Vietnam War, cult of youth 
The View from the Edge [Sublime and Anxious Eye] –  A look at those who made visual art from the crags and vistas of their internal world. Expressionism
van Gogh, Munch, Toulouse-Lautrec, Gauguin, Kirchner, Kokoschka, Soutine, Bacon, de Kooning, photographical evidence of the Holocaust, Marc, Klee, Kandinsky, Brancusi, Rothko, Pollock, Motherwell 
Culture as Nature – Examining the art that referred to the man-made world which fed off culture itself. Pop art and celebrity
O'Keeffe, Davis, Rauschenberg, Schwitters, Johns, Hamilton, the influence of television, Warhol, Liechtenstein, Rosenquist, Katz, Las Vegas as a single "lousy" artwork, Oldenburg, McLuhan and quantity over quality 
The Future That Was [End of Modernity] – The commercialisation of modern art, the decline of modernism, and art without substance. Land art, performance art, and body art
Heizer, MoMA and rich patrons, SoHo and urban renewal, Pompidou Centre and the changing uses of art, da Panicale, art as public discourse, the Salon system, the avantgarde and the bourgeoisie, Courbet, Andre, Judd, public and private, Segal, Kienholz, Frankenthaler, Louis, Noland, Stella, Riley, fashion, the art market, Brisley, Samaras, Rainer, Hockney, Beuys, de Maria

2004 update 
 The NEW Shock of the New (2004) – How the art world has changed, 25 years later.
 Eiffel tower, World Trade Center, 9/11, Turner, Goya, David, Picasso's Guernica as the last truly political painting, Whitney Biennial, Warhol, fashion as the primary model of art, Koons, Duchamp, Michelangelo, Masaccio, exploding prices of the art market, Rego, Kiefer, information overload, Hockney, the skill of drawing, art as the opposite of mass media, Freud, Gilbert and George, post-modernism, slowness of painting, Mondrian, Rothko, Kelly, Scully, beauty, Eliasson

Book 
The book of the series was published in 1980 by the BBC under the title The Shock of the New: Art and the century of change. It was republished in 1991 by Thames and Hudson. The book was included by The Guardian in their list of the top 100 non-fiction books, and was still in print in 2012.

Video releases 
The televised edition of The Shock of the New has been posted on the internet and is published as a set of DVDs.

See also
 Civilisation
 The Ascent of Man

References

External links

BBC television documentaries
Documentary film series
Modern art
Documentary television series about art
1980 British television series debuts